William Leslie (Sydney, Australia) was a rugby league footballer in the New South Wales Rugby League (NSWRL)'s foundation season of 1908. 

Leslie played for the Eastern Suburbs club.

References
 The Eastern Suburbs club website

Australian rugby league players
Sydney Roosters players
Year of death missing
Year of birth missing
Rugby league players from Sydney